Religious communalism may refer to:
 Religious communism, common ownership within a religious community
 Religious communalism (South Asia), sectarian conflict among religious groups in South Asia